John Row (born 1947) is an English storyteller and public speaker with roots in Ipswich, UK.

Life
John Row tours schools around the world and other institutions such as prisons. He has been a presence in Texas where he has performed in detention centres for the young inmates. He was the first storyteller in residence in a British prison.

He is a regular performer at festivals throughout the U.K. He has a weekly radio show on Ipswich Community Radio one of the first community radio stations in the county which now has a full-time licence.

He is a regular contributor to 'On Track' a magazine for rail travellers in the Southern Region.
Touring with singer/songwriter Paddy Stratton he is one half of 'Serious Times', a music and poetry show.

Performing in the 1960s he joined up with Graham Flight from the Canterbury band 'Wild Flowers' which spawned both 'Soft Machine' and 'Caravan'. In the 1970s he toured with Nick Toczek in 'Stereo Graffiti' and in the 1980s and early 1990s  with 'Sound Proposition' an anarchic combination of free form jazz, funk and poetry which toured East Germany in the last weeks of its existence.

Throughout the late 1990s and the first half of the 2000s (decade) he concentrated on storytelling apart from on his visits to Texas where he appeared at the Austin International Poetry Festival. 
His book of poems for children 'The Pong Machine' was published in 1999.

He also participated in a workshop for children in Algeria in September 2012, a workshop held by the British Council in Algiers, alongside that was a workshop for English teachers and how to teach English through storytelling.

External links
 John Row, Storyteller
 John Row School Visits

References 

1947 births
Living people
English male poets